The Lunar Infrastructure for Exploration (LIFE) is a project to build a space telescope on the far side of the Moon, and is actively promoted by EADS Astrium Space Transportation of Germany and the Netherlands Foundation for Research in Astronomy ASTRON/LOFAR. The project was presented for the first time publicly at the 2005 IAF Congress in Fukuoka.

The 1.3 billion euro project would involve a radio telescope to be located on the polar region of the far side of the Moon. It is proposed to start the program at the ESA January 2008 ministerial council.

Launched between 2013 and 2015, the radio telescope could look for exoplanets and detect signals in the 1-10 MHz range. Such signals cannot be detected on Earth because of ionosphere interference. 

The radio telescope would consist of a lander vehicle that would deploy dipoles across a 300-400 m area. The dipoles, which receive the cosmic radio signals, would be deployed either by a dispenser or by a team of small mobile robots. The South Polar location would ensure permanent sunlight and direct communication with Earth. The telescope lander would also carry geophones, which could listen to meteorite impacts on the Moon's surface.

Another German aerospace consortium, OHB-System, is also promoting a lunar lander concept called Mona Lisa, showing that there is a strong push in Europe for a lunar lander in the medium term. Models of both concepts were displayed at ILA in 2006.

See also
List of space telescopes

References
Astron - EADS press release
LIFE on Moon

Space telescopes
Proposed spacecraft
Exploration of the Moon